University Soccer Stadium is a soccer-specific stadium located on the campus of California State University, Chico in Chico, California. The stadium seats 2,500 and is home to the school's soccer teams.

California State University, Chico
Defunct National Premier Soccer League stadiums
Soccer venues in California